Ball is a lunar impact crater that is located in the rugged southern highlands of the Moon. It was named after British astronomer William Ball. The formation is circular and symmetrical, and has received little significant wear. The interior is rough-surfaced, curving downward toward the relatively wide central peak at the midpoint.

The crater is situated on the rim of the more sizable Deslandres, to the west of the crater Lexell, and southeast of Gauricus. To the south is Sasserides, and further to the south-southwest is the prominent ray crater Tycho.

Satellite craters
By convention these features are identified on lunar maps by placing the letter on the side of the crater midpoint that is closest to Ball.

References

 
 
 
 
 
 
 
 
 
 
 

Impact craters on the Moon